Papa Wheelie is an American punk rock/heavy metal band, formed in 1996 by former Metallica bassist Jason Newsted.

The band emerged from a mountain biking-based friendship between Jason and his neighborhood bike shop owner. Early in the project, Newsted played the drums and fellow Michigan-native Steven Wiig played the guitar.  Since then, Newsted assumed full guitar and vocal responsibilities while Wiig returned to the drumkit and handled artistic duties.

The band records every single session at Newsted's home studio, The Chophouse, and have played several Bay Area gigs - ranging from outdoor BBQs to his neighbor's living room birthday party to local San Francisco rock clubs.

The band was in an idle state due to Newsted's shoulder injuries, but was resurrected in August 2011 after Newsted & Wiig simultaneously viewed the U.S. Desert episode of Anthony Bourdain: No Reservations featuring Kyuss, Queens of the Stone Age and Desert Sessions founder Josh Homme, which inspired the resurrection of Papa Wheelie and resulted in the band performing several local Bay Area shows - including opening for Anvil at The Red Devil Lounge and Kyuss Lives! at San Francisco's Regency Ballroom on November 19, 2011, with The Sword & Black Cobra.

Members 
Jason Newsted – vocal, guitar
Steven Wiig – drums
Joe Ledesma – bass

Discography 
2002: Unipsycho
2002: Live Lycanthropy

Quotes
"We ain't good... but we're LOUD"
"Upon the same ground twice shalt not thy Wheelie tread!" - Fathor Wheelor
"Our first gig was a neighborhood barbecue. It was all improvised. None of the music is prearranged. There are some skeletons of riffs and no set lyrics. It makes me able to enjoy playing, feeling the noise, with no agenda and no one from a record company breathing down our necks telling us what to do." - Jason Newsted
"Papa Wheelie is big, loud, and scary, like some crazed, twisted, drinking session caught on tape. 53 minutes and 32 seconds of pure madness." - Absolut
Metal's review of 'UNIPSYCHO'

External links
PAPA WHEELIE
Papa Wheelie Media
Papa Wheelie MySpace Page
"Live Lycanthropy" Review
VIDEO: Live From The Chophouse
"Rituals of Desire" Video
Foundrymusic.com Article
PAPA WHEELIE RETURNS

Heavy metal musical groups from California
Musical groups from the San Francisco Bay Area
Punk rock groups from California
Heavy metal supergroups
Musical groups established in 1996
Musical groups disestablished in 2002